Tonza is a genus of  moths in the family Tonzidae.

Species
Tonza callicitra  Meyrick 1913
Tonza citrorrhoa  Meyrick, 1905 (Taiwan)
Tonza purella  Walker, 1864 (Australia)
Tonza toga  Bippus, 2020 (Réunion)

Former species
Tonza circumdatella  Walker, 1864 (Australia)

References

Plutellidae
Moth genera
Taxa named by Francis Walker (entomologist)